Andrew Himes (born 1950) was the founding executive director of the Charter for Compassion, launched in 2008 by TED.com and Karen Armstrong, with the mission of supporting the emergence of a "global compassion movement".  He is the author of The Sword of the Lord: The Roots of Fundamentalism in an American Family.  Himes' grandfather was John R. Rice, dean of American fundamentalists for decades until his death in 1980, and mentor to many younger Baptist preachers including Billy Graham and Jerry Falwell, as well as founding editor of The Sword of the Lord newspaper.  Himes' great-grandfather, Will Rice, was a preacher, a farmer, and a Texas State senator.

In 1989, Himes was founding editor of MacTech, a journal of Macintosh software development.  In 1992, he was founding editor of the Microsoft Developer Network, and then led the first web development project in the history of the company, a project dubbed the MSDN OffRamp, aimed at making articles, resources, and technical information available on the Internet to an audience of software developers. Beginning in 1994 Himes managed Microsoft's platform web team producing the sites for all of Microsoft’s operating systems, browsers, development tools, and technologies.  After leaving Microsoft, he founded Project Alchemy, a non-profit company providing technology assistance, training, consulting, database and web solutions to hundreds of grassroots organizations working for social justice in the Pacific Northwest.

Himes was co-founder in 2003 of the international movement, Poets Against the War, and produced the 2005 documentary Voices in Wartime an exploration of the trauma of war through the lens of poetry. In 2004, Himes founded Voices Education Project, a web site dedicated to "teaching peace and compassion", now the education program of the Charter for Compassion. In 2008, Himes was a member of the organizing committee for the Seeds of Compassion event in Seattle, WA.

References

External links
 Seattle Times Review of 'Voices in Wartime': "Documentary Gives Voice to War's Anguish," April 15, 2005. 
 Washington Post Review: "Voices in Wartime" Documentary, April 15, 2005
 Seattle Times Feature: "Veterans and Observers Take Part in 'Voices from the Front Lines'", April 27, 2007
 Seattle Times Feature "A Soldier Fights for Empathy," January 25, 2008.
 Seattle Times Editorial: "Seeds of Compassion", April 11, 2008.
 Seattle Times Review: "'Revival!': A Fundamentalist Upbringing Shapes a Seeker of Truth," May 14, 2008.
 Medium.com Essay: "Business and Compassion" by Andrew Himes, October, 2016.

American male writers
1950 births
Living people